PS Mayflower was a passenger vessel built for the Solent Steam Packet Company in 1866.

History

She was built by Marshall Brothers in Newcastle and launched in 1866 and was used to expand the company services, offering a daily passage between Lymington and Portsmouth.

She was acquired by the London and South Western Railway in 1884.

In 1905 she was acquired by Joseph Constant in London and registered in Southampton. She was broken up in 1912.

References

1866 ships
Steamships of the United Kingdom
Paddle steamers of the United Kingdom
Ships built on the River Tyne
Ships of the London and South Western Railway